Club Deportivo Venezuela (usually called Deportivo Venezuela) was a Venezuelan professional club based in Caracas. Founded in 1926, the club has won four First Division titles in the amateur era.

Honours
Primera División Venezolana
Champions (4): 1928, 1929, 1931, 1933

External links
Deportivo Venezuela 

Football clubs in Venezuela
Football clubs in Caracas
1926 establishments in Venezuela
Defunct football clubs in Venezuela